John Rainey is the name of:

John W. Rainey (1880–1923), U.S. Representative from Illinois
John Rainey (baseball) (1864–1912), American Major League Baseball player
John David Rainey (born 1945), U.S. federal judge

See also
 Jon Douglas Rainey (born 1970), professional thief on the reality TV show It Takes a Thief